Sumaterana, commonly known as Sumatran cascade frogs, is a genus of true frogs in the family Ranidae endemic to the island of Sumatra, Indonesia. Species inhabit fast-flowing streams found in primary or secondary forests.

Species
Three species are recognized:
Sumaterana crassiovis (Boulenger, 1920)
Sumaterana dabulescens Arifin, Smart, Hertwig, Smith, Iskandar, and Haas, 2018
Sumaterana montana Arifin, Smart, Hertwig, Smith, Iskandar, and Haas, 2018

References

 
True frogs
Amphibian genera
Endemic fauna of Sumatra
Amphibians of Indonesia
Taxa described in 2018